Parable of the Talents is a science fiction novel by the American writer Octavia E. Butler, published in 1998. It is the second in a series of two, a sequel to Parable of the Sower. 
It won the Nebula Award for Best Novel.

Plot
Parable of the Talents is told from the points of view of Lauren Oya Olamina, her daughter Larkin Olamina/Asha Vere, and Lauren’s husband Taylor Franklin Bankole. The novel consists of journal entries by Lauren and Bankole and passages by Asha Vere. Five years after the events of the previous novel Parable of the Sower, Lauren has founded a new community called Acorn centered around her religion, Earthseed, which is predicated on the belief that humanity's destiny is to travel beyond Earth and live on other planets in order for humanity to reach adulthood.

The novel is set against the backdrop of a dystopian United States that has come under the grip of a Christian fundamentalist denomination called "Christian America" led by President Andrew Steele Jarret. Seeking to restore American power and prestige, and using the slogan "Make America Great Again", Jarret embarks on a crusade to cleanse America of non-Christian faiths. Slavery has resurfaced with advanced "shock collars" being used to control slaves. Virtual reality headsets known as "Dreamasks" are also popular since they enable wearers to escape their harsh reality.

During the course of the novel, Acorn is attacked and taken over by Christian American "Crusaders" and turned into a re-education camp. For the next year and a half, Lauren and the other adults are enslaved and forced to wear "shock collars". Their Christian American captors exploit them as forced labor under the pretext of "reforming" them. Lauren and several of the women are also regularly raped by their captors, who regard them as "heathen". In 2035, Lauren and her followers eventually rebel and kill their captors. To avoid retribution, they are forced to disperse into hiding. By 2036, President Jarret is defeated after a single term due to public dissatisfaction with the "Alaska–Canada War" and revelations of his role in witch burnings.

Lauren looks for Larkin for over a year, travelling throughout Northern California and Oregon in her search. At the same time, she decides to re-establish Earthseed by teaching individuals about the religion during her travels and training them to educate others. She gains a significant following among the affluent in Portland, Oregon, and one of her more ardent supporters helps her publish Earthseed: The First Book of the Living, which contains the verses she wrote defining the religion. This launches both Earthseed and her influence nationwide and at the same time, as she is hopeful for the future of humanity amongst the stars, she gradually abandons hope that she will find Larkin and gives up her search.

Meanwhile, Larkin is adopted by an African American Christian America family and renamed "Asha Vere Alexander" after a popular Dreamask hero. Unloved and abused by her adoptive parents, Asha grows up never knowing who her biological parents are. As an adult, Asha reunites with her uncle Marcos "Marc" Duran, who was believed to have perished in the events of the previous novel and has since become a Christian America minister. With Uncle Marc's help, Larkin becomes an academic historian but leaves the Christian faith.

Unknown to Asha, Uncle Marc had previously re-established contact with his long-lost half-sister Lauren. Marc claimed that the "Crusaders" were rogue elements who do not represent Christian America. He tells Asha that her mother is dead, and never told Lauren he had found her daughter. With Jarret's legacy in disgrace, Lauren's Earthseed religion grows in popularity in a post-war United States and throughout the rest of the world, funding scholarships for needy university students and encouraging humanity to leave Earth and settle in other worlds.

After Asha learns that Lauren is her biological mother, she manages to meet with her. Though Asha is unable to forgive her mother for choosing to dedicate her life to Earthseed instead of continuing to look for her, Lauren tells her daughter that her door is always open. After learning that her half-brother Uncle Marc hid the fact that Asha was related to Lauren, Lauren severs all ties with her estranged brother, which further strains her relationship with Asha. They talk occasionally over the next 23 years but never truly bond as Asha decided "She never really needed us, so we didn't let ourselves need her." Lauren dies at the age of 81 while watching the first shuttles leaving Earth for the starship Christopher Columbus, which carries settlers in suspended animation to the first human colony on another world.

Reception
Parable of the Talents won the 2000 Nebula Award for Best Novel. The academic Jana Diemer Llewellyn regards it as a harsh indictment of religious fundamentalism and compares the novel to Joanna Russ' The Female Man and Margaret Atwood's The Handmaid's Tale. The Los Angeles Times op-ed editor Abby Aguirre has likened the religious fundamentalism and authoritarianism of President Jarret to the "Make America Great Again" rhetoric of the Trump Administration.

Proposed third Parable novel
Butler had planned to write several more Parable novels, tentatively titled Parable of the Trickster, Parable of the Teacher, Parable of Chaos, and Parable of Clay. Parable of the Trickster was the most developed and would have focused on the community's struggle to survive on a new planet, Bow. She began this novel after finishing Parable of the Talents and mentioned her work on it in several interviews, but at some point encountered writer's block that led to numerous false starts. She eventually shifted her creative attention, resulting in Fledgling, her final novel. The various false starts in the novel can now be found among Butler's papers at the Huntington Library, as described in an article in the Los Angeles Review of Books.

See also

Parable of the Sower

Further reading 
 Allen, Marlene D. “Octavia Butler's ‘Parable’ Novels and the ‘Boomerang’ of African American History.” Callaloo 32. 4 2009 pp. 1353–1365.
 Caputi, Jane. "Facing Change: African Mythic Origins in Octavia Butler’s Parable Novels." Goddesses and Monsters: Women, Myth, Power, and Popular Culture. Madison: U of Wisconsin P, 2004. 366-369. 
 Jos, Philip H. “Fear and the Spiritual Realism of Octavia Butler's Earthseed.” Utopian Studies 23. 2 2012 pp. 408–429.
 Lacey, Lauren. J. "Octavia Butler on Coping with Power in Parable of the Sower, Parable of the Talents, and Fledgling.” Critique 49.4 (Summer 2008): 379-394.
 Melzer, Patricia. "'All That You Touch You Change': Utopian Desire and the Concept of Change in Octavia Butler's Parable of the Sower and Parable of the Talents." Contemporary Literary Criticism Select. Gale, 2008. Originally published in FEMSPEC 3.2 (2002): 31-52.
 Nilges, Mathias. “‘We Need the Stars’: Change, Community, and the Absent Father in Octavia Butler's ‘Parable of the Sower’ and ‘Parable of the Talents'.’” Callaloo 32.4 2009 pp. 1332–1352.
 Stanford, Ann Folwell. "A Dream of Communitas: Octavia Butler’s Parable of the Sower and Parable of the Talents and Roads to the Possible." Bodies in a Broken World: Women Novelists of Color and the Politics of Medicine. Chapel Hill: The U of North Carolina P, 2003. 196-218. 
 Stillman, Peter G. "Dystopian Critiques, Utopian Possibilities, and Human Purposes in Octavia Butler’s Parables.” Utopian Studies 14.1 (2003): 15-35.

References

External links
  Parable of the Talents: A Novel
 

1998 American novels
Novels by Octavia Butler
1998 science fiction novels
Dystopian novels
African-American novels
English-language novels
Nebula Award for Best Novel-winning works
Religion in science fiction
Climate change novels